Laurentian Environmental Learning Center (LEC) is an outdoors camp area that is located in Britt, Minnesota, United States, on Arrowhead Lake in the Superior National Forest. LEC is an educational camp where schools, and other organizations go to learn about the outdoors. It is equipped with activities that enhances recreation skills. The activities provided are also hands on and discovery oriented. The center is well known for their wind energy curriculum. This curriculum is the created by the teamwork of Laurentian Environmental Staff, Minnesota Department of Commerce, Great River Energy and Minnesota Power. It is owned and operated by Mounds View Public Schools. It is accredited by The Commission on International and Trans-Regional Accreditation.

Facilities
At LEC there are 160 beds for large and small groups. There are also five large classroom halls, a main lodge, and a dining center.

Attractions
 32 foot climbing wall
 Archery range
 Hiking and skiing trails
 Canoes and rowboats
 Outdoor sauna 
 A large playing field
 Outdoor campfire theatre area

Programs
There are many programs that are available for school groups to attend. There are 18 educational classes that can be taken at the camp to further knowledge on the outdoors and other activities. There are also programs for groups, companies, families, and individuals.

Reference List

External links
 Laurentian Environmental Center

Buildings and structures in St. Louis County, Minnesota
Education in St. Louis County, Minnesota
Outdoor education organizations
Nature centers in Minnesota